Norrköpings KK is a Swedish swim team from Norrköping, founded September 7, 1919. Its best-known swimmers are the Svenska Dagbladet Gold Medal winner Björn Borg and Olympic silver medallist Tina Gustafsson.

Swimmers
Björn Borg
Tina Gustafsson
Per Nylin

External links
NKK's official homepage 

Swimming clubs in Sweden
Sports clubs established in 1919
Sport in Östergötland County